Cleora sublunaria, the double-lined gray moth, is a species of moth of the  family Geometridae. It is found in North America, where it has been recorded from south-eastern United States west to Texas.

The length of the forewings is 13–17 mm for males and 14–17 mm for females. Adults are mostly on wing from February to June in one generation per year.

The larvae feed on Quercus and Comptonia species. They are green to brown with faint dorsal and lateral stripes. The head has faint spotting, forming short concentric bands. Larvae can be found from June to July.

References

Moths described in 1857
Cleora
Moths of North America